Donovan Boucher (born August 8, 1961) is a Jamaican/Canadian professional welter/light middle/middle/super middleweight boxer of the 1980s, '90s and 2000s who won the Canada welterweight title, and Commonwealth welterweight title, and was a challenger for World Boxing Association (WBA) Inter-Continental welterweight title against Glenwood Brown, World Boxing Association (WBA) World welterweight title against Crisanto España, and Canada light middleweight title against Gareth Sutherland, his professional fighting weight varied from , i.e. welterweight to , i.e. super middleweight.

References

External links

Image - Donovan Boucher (right)
How boxing champ Donovan Boucher, 52, keeps fit

1961 births
Jamaican male boxers
Light-middleweight boxers
Middleweight boxers
Jamaican emigrants to Canada
Super-middleweight boxers
Welterweight boxers
Living people
Canadian male boxers
Black Canadian boxers
Place of birth missing (living people)